Vinogradovka is a rural locality (a selo) in Vinogradovsky Selsoviet of Bureysky District, Amur Oblast, Russia. The population was 438 as of 2018. There are 7 streets.

Geography 
Vinogradovka is located 52 km southwest of Novobureysky (the district's administrative centre) by road. Zelvino is the nearest rural locality.

References 

Rural localities in Bureysky District